Mara Region (Mkoa wa Mara in Swahili) is one of Tanzania's 31 administrative regions. The region is comparable in size to the combined land area of the nation state of El Salvador. The neighboring regions are Mwanza Region and Simiyu Region (to the south), Arusha Region (to the southeast), and Kagera Region (across Lake Victoria). The Mara Region borders Kenya (to the northeast).The regional capital is the municipality of Musoma. Mara Region is known for being the home of Serengeti National Park, a UNESCO World Heritage site and also the birth place of Tanzania's founding father Julius Nyerere. Under British colonial occupation, the Mara Region was a district called the Lake Province, which became the Lake Region after independence in 1961.

Geography 
The Mara Region is located in the northern part of mainland Tanzania. It is located between latitudes 1° 0’ and 2° 31’ and between longitudes 33° 10’ and 35° 15’. It contains 30,150 sq kilometers total, 10,584 sq kilometers of such being water area. To the north the Mara Region borders Uganda and Kenya. It is also bordered by the Arusha Region to its east, Simiyu Region to its south, as well as the Mwanza Region in the southwest and west. 15% of Lake Victoria's water body—10,854 square kilometers—is submerged in the Mara Region.

Climate 
The maximum temperature of the region is 29.32℃ and minimum of 27.68℃, with an average of 28.50℃. The Mara Region experiences a bimodal rainfall pattern, consisting of two rainy seasons and two dry seasons. The long rainfall period last between February until June. The short rainfall period last between September and June.

The Mara Region can be divided into 3 climatic zones. The northern zone resides in the Tarime District as well as parts of the Serengeti District. On average, it receives annual rainfall of 1,250-2,000 mm/year. The central zone includes much of Musoma District and eastern parts of Serengeti. It receives an annual rainfall of 900–1300 mm/year. The Lowland zone covers much of Bunda and the lake shores. This zone receives 700–900 mm/year.
Lake Victoria borders the Mara Region of Tanzania. The lake has a surface area 68,800 square km, and its coastline expands over 3,220 km. It is the Nile's principle water reservoir. Lake Victoria has numerous archipelagos, or groups of islands. Islands found in Mara territory are numerous, in the Bunda District Council, there are Bulamba, Nafuba, Sozia, Sata, Namguma, Machwele, Ilela, Igali, Chalika, Nyakalango, Bugulani, Nachenyele, and Guyanza; in the Musoma Municipal Council, Rukuba, and Iriga; and in the Rorya District Council, Towa, Kinesi, and Bugwambwa Island. There are a plethora of over 200 species of fish, however economically tilapia and nile perch are important.

Vegetation 
The Mara Region is mostly covered with natural vegetation, but there are also large areas of cultivation that are underutilized. The most prevalent landscape seen in the natural vegetation is the “savannah type” most commonly found in areas that receive annual rainfall between 900 and 1200 mms/year. The Serengeti plains consist of savannah type vegetation with predominant forest vegetation, but mostly scattered woodlands and wooded grasslands. The northern zone, receiving high annual rainfall, is composed of the humid forest. The lowland zones with less annual rainfall consist of wooded grassland and bushland of dense thickets.
14,750 sq kilometers of land is occupied by the Serengeti National Park. It is located at the border of the Arusha and Mara Region. It was established in 1951, and contains the vast and astonishing concentration of plain animals left anywhere in Africa.

Economy
Mining, fishing, tourism, cattle raising, crop farming, and cross-border operations are the mainstays of the Mara Region's distinctive and alluring economy.

Agriculture
About 80% of the region's workforce is employed in agriculture, which accounts for about 60% of the region's GDP. Cassava, rice, maize, sorghum, finger-millet, bulrush millet, sweet potatoes, potatoes, beans, Bambara nuts, ground nuts, green gram, chickpeas, banana, cotton, coffee, sunflower, sesame, onions, tomatoes, watermelon, oranges, avocados, pawpaw, pineapples, and lemons are some of the crops grown in the area.
However, the region's critical crops include bananas, coffee, cassava, horticulture, and cotton. The estimated amount of fertile land in the region is 2,500,000 hectares, however only 500,000 hectares, or around 20% of the arable land, are typically used for crop production.

The Mara Region is one of the eleven cotton-growing regions in the Western Cotton Growing Area (WCGA), and when compared to other regions, it produces an average of 220 kg of cotton per acre. Mara was the pioneer of the cotton contract farming model in Tanzania. Out of the potential area of 22,632 hectares suited for the crop, the region is predicted to cultivate 3,065 hectares of Arabica coffee. In the Mara region, coffee is grown in four districts. These districts are Tarime, Serengeti, Rorya, and Butiama. Small-scale farmers, with average plot sizes of 1 acre and 800 kilograms of production per acre, are the principal producers. In Tarime District, tea is mostly farmed by small-holder farmers, who have land plots ranging from 0.2 acre to 2 acres and produce 600 kilos per acre each month. 

Air service to the Mara region is provided by Musoma Airport, the airstrips at Seronera and Fort Ikoma in the Serengeti National Park, and Magena Airstrip near Tarime.

Fishing
Fishing in the Mara region is primarily done on Lake Victoria, which has 49% of its total area within Tanzanian territory. Along Lake Victoria, the Mara River, and its streams, fishing is done. It is rated as one of the region's top economic objectives. About 379,707 individuals are employed in fishing as a source of income, which accounts for 40% of the labor force in the area.
The most common methods of processing sardines in the area include sun drying, frying, and, in rare instances, smoking. When compared to sardines from other regions, Mara Region sardines (dagaa), especially those from Kibuyi in Rorya District, are the best and have the most weight per gallon or per bucket. A monthly average catch of 3,452.25 metric tonnes is thought to be marketed both inside and beyond the Mara Region. 

Nile perch is a valuable source of food and nourishment for families, as well as a raw material for fish processing factories. Bunda, Musoma, and Rorya districts saw a quantity of catch  locally. Fisheries in Rukuba Makoko, Nyakarango, Nafuba, Namguma, Machwera, and Sozia. Musoma Fish Processors do processing in the area in the beaches of Ryamakabe, Toa, Ngonche, Msasani, and Bugambwa. The majority of the processing of the Nile perch that is brought into the area. Roughly 72%, or 13,373.07 metric tonnes—takes place in Mwanza.

Wildlife, Tourism and Reserves 

The Mara Region is home to the Serengeti National Park, one of the world's most famous national parks. Listed as a World Heritage Site, the national park occupies a large area of grasslands and woodlands and is home to a diverse range of wildlife. It attracts close to 150,000 tourists every year. The sanctuary is home to more than a million wildebeest, 200,000 zebras, and 300,000 Thomson's gazelles. Additionally, Mara is also home to The Mwalimu Nyerere Museum, which houses historical facts on the country's independence. The museum is situated in Butiama Village, the final resting place of Mwalimu Julius Kambarage Nyerere, the country's founding father.

Legally protected forests are thought to cover 9,541.2 hectares in the Mara Region. 2,927 of these are within the jurisdiction of the Central Government, 3,593.3 are under the control of district councils, and 2,980 are not. Village governments control 5 hectares, while the private sector is in charge of 40.4 hectares.

The Bunda and Serengeti Districts' Ikorongo and Grumeti Game Reserves, with a combined area of 993.4 km2, were established in 1993. Ikoma Wildlife Management Area (IWMA), which spans 242.3 km2, is present in addition to the Reserves. There are many different wildlife species there. The Mara ecosystem is renowned for its yearly migration of more than 1.5 million wildebeest and 250,000 zebra. The second-largest migration of terrestrial mammals in the world takes place in the Serengeti.

Demographics 
The Mara Region is the ancestral homeland to the following people groups:Zanaki, Kurya, Ngurimi, Ikoma, Ikizu, Kwaya, Jita, Suba, Kerewe, Sizaki  and Simbiti.
In 2016 the Tanzania National Bureau of Statistics report there were 1,924,230 people in the region, from 1,743,830 in 2012. For 2002–2012, the region's 2.5 percent average annual population growth rate was the thirteenth highest in the country.

Administrative divisions

Districts 
Mara Region is divided into one city coucil, two town councils and four distric councils.

Constituencies 
For parliamentary elections, Tanzania is divided into constituencies. As of the 2022 elections the Mara Region had ten constituencies:

 Bunda
 Bunda Urban
 Butiama
 Musoma
 Musoma Urban
 Mwibara
 Rorya
 Serengeti
 Tarime
 Tarime Urban

Notable persons from Mara Region 
 Julius Nyerere- the first president of both Tanganyika and Tanzania, attended Mwisenge Primary School in Musoma
 Joseph Warioba- Tanzania's sixth prime minister (1984-1985) and fourth vice president (1985-1990)
 Stephen Wassira- politician
 Maria Nyerere- Tanzania's first first lady
 Daniel Owino Misiani- Tanzanian musician (the founder of Benga music)

Academics: 
 Ibrahim Juma- Tanzanian High Court judge
 Prof. Philemon Sarungi- Tanzania's first Orthopaedic Surgeon

Athletes:
 Dickson Marwa Mkami- Tanzanian long-distance runner
 Mbwana Samata- football athlete (Simba, TP Mazembe, and national team)
 Bitta John Musiba, football athlete (Simba and national team)
 Amri Kiemba- football athlete (Simba and national team)
 Elias Mfungo Sulus- Former President of the Tanzania Amateur Athletics Association ( TAAA) now known as AT, East Africa Athletics Federation and the First Tanzanian to become a Technical Committee member of the International Amateur Athletics  Federation (IAAF)and former National Athletic Team in 1950s and 1960s.
 Suleiman Nyambui Tanzanian Olympic Silver medalist and athlete from Musoma, Mara.

See also 
Serengeti National Park

References

External links 

 

 
Regions of Tanzania